This article contains lists of named passenger trains in Europe, listed by country.  Listing by country does eliminate some EuroCity services from the list, but they are listed on the relevant EuroCity page for daytime trains and the EuroNight page for nighttime trains. Also separately listed are the named City Night Line services.

Austria

Belarus

Belgium

Bulgaria

Croatia 
source

Czech Republic

Finland

France

Germany

Greece

Hungary 

Status as from December 2022

*:not served by all trains

Italy 

List of named passenger trains of Italy

Kazakhstan

Netherlands

Norway

Poland 

Majority of Polish long-distance trains, as well as some regional and local trains, are named. Their names may be connected with station terminus (e.g. "Berolinum" or "Łodzianin"), famous people (e.g. "Reymont" or "Sobieski") or some literary figures (e.g. "Oleńka" or "Wokulski"). Some can be also more abstract, like "Pirat" ("Pirate") or "Swarożyc" ("Svarozhits")
Train numbers may change every year, they depend from many things, like station terminus or railway lines.

Portugal 
Since 1990, with the opening of the LGV Atlantique, the Sud Express only runs between Lisbon and Hendaye and between Irún and Lisbon and it is no longer operated by SNCF. There is a connecting TGV service between Hendaye and Paris and between Paris and Irún. From October 2012, the Sud Express is upgraded to Trenhotel and runs together with the Lusitânia between Lisbon and Medina del Campo via Coimbra and Salamanca. Also, from this date on, the Sud Express is only operated by CP.

Romania

Russia 

List of named passenger trains of Russia

Slovakia

Spain 

There have been up to 125 named trains in Spain.

Sweden 

Before 1980 there were several more named trains in Sweden

Switzerland 

List of named passenger trains of Switzerland

Ukraine

United Kingdom 

List of named passenger trains of the United Kingdom

References

Europe
Named passenger trains
Rail transport in Europe